The 2016 Vietnam marine life disaster was a water pollution crisis affecting Hà Tĩnh, Quảng Bình, Quảng Trị and Thừa Thiên–Huế provinces in central Vietnam.

Fish carcasses were reported to have washed up on the beaches of Hà Tĩnh province from at least 6 April 2016. Later, a large number of dead fish were found on the coast of Hà Tĩnh and three other provinces (Quảng Bình, Quảng Trị and Thừa Thiên–Huế) until 18 April 2016. Formosa Ha Tinh Steel, a steel plant built by the Taiwanese corporation Formosa Plastics, discharged toxic industrial waste illegally into the ocean through drainage pipes. After denying responsibility for months, Formosa accepted responsibility for the fish deaths on 30 June 2016.

The massive marine life destruction led to a number of protests by Vietnamese citizens in some cities on 1 May 2016, calling for a cleaner environment and demanding transparency in the investigation process.

Causes 
The Formosa steel plant is suspected to be the source of the toxic chemical waste. The company admitted that there was a sewage pipe connecting the plant and the ocean and it was reported that several days before the incident,  of chemicals were imported by Formosa in order to clean the pipe. Formosa was later ordered by Vietnamese authorities to remove those sewage pipes. However, the Vietnamese government denied that the Formosa steel plant was linked to the disaster.

Vietnamese scientists largely agreed that the source of toxins was from the Vũng Áng Economic Zone, in which the Formosa steel plant was located; meanwhile, the Vietnamese government was accused of concealing the findings from the public.

In a press conference held on 27 April, Võ Tuấn Nhân, the Deputy Minister of Natural Resources and Environment, claimed that the two main suspects of the marine life destruction were red tide and toxins generated by people. However, the red tide explanation was quickly rejected by the Vietnamese Fisheries Society.

At 5:00 PM on 30 June 2016, the Government Office held a press conference to announce the causes and perpetrators of this particularly serious environmental disaster. Accordingly, the Natural Resources and Environment Ministry and other relevant units have checked and discovered violations regarding Formosa discharging toxic waste into the sea waste water containing toxins exceeding the permitted level. Based on the ground-level investigation, "the Vietnamese authorities along with the participation of scientists had concluded that Formosa was responsible for this environment pollution that led to marine life disaster."

Effects and responses 
Nguyễn Xuân Phúc, the Prime Minister of Vietnam, claimed that the massive marine life destruction was "the most serious environmental disaster Vietnam has ever faced".

On 6 May, the amount of collected fish carcasses surpassed .

The disaster disrupted the livelihood of fishermen in four provinces in the central coast of Vietnam. On 4 May 2016, Vietnamese government had announced a ban of processing and selling seafood caught within 20 nautical miles of central Vietnam provinces, just one day after the Ministry of Natural Resources and Environment had claimed that the seafood in the region met safety standards.

According to the local government of Quảng Bình, the fishermen of this province had already lost $5.2 million; in addition, the disaster also heavily impacted the tourism industry as nearly 30% tourists cancelled their planned tours to the affected provinces for the national holiday season starting on 30 April.

Protests 

On 5 March 2017, protesters gathered on Nguyễn Du Street and in front of the Ho Chi Minh City post office. Police tried to disperse the protesters. Overseas Vietnamese also joined in protest around the world, demanding greater action about Formosa and protesting police abuse of protesters.

Government response 
The Vietnamese government has cracked down on protests, including arresting Nguyễn Văn Hoá, a journalist who covered the Formosa protests. He was charged for "conducting propaganda against the state" under Article 88 of the Vietnamese Penal Code and sentenced to seven years prison. Lê Đình Lượng, another citizen journalist, was arrested for "activities attempting to overthrow the state" in July 2017. He was later sentenced to 20 years prison and 5 years house arrest in August 2018. State media also accused "hostile elements", as well as some of "taking advantage of religion" to incite protests.

See also 
 Nguyễn Văn Hoá
 Lê Đình Lượng
 Environmental issues in Vietnam
2014 Vietnam anti-China protests, which also targeted the Formosa steel mill

References 

Marine life
Marine life disaster,2016
2016 in the environment
Fish kill
Marine life disaster,2016
No-U Movement
Taiwan–Vietnam relations
Environmental disasters in Asia